Baltasar Breki Samper (born 22 July 1989), sometimes referred to as Baltasar Breki Baltasarsson, is an Icelandic actor. He is the son of Icelandic director Baltasar Kormákur and the grandson of Catalan painter Baltasar Samper. Before graduating from the Iceland Academy of the Arts in 2015 Baltasar Breki helped his father on several films as second assistant director. He is known for his role as Hjörtur in the Icelandic TV series Trapped.

Early life
Baltasar Breki was born in Reykjavík, Iceland to parents Ástrós Gunnarsdóttir, choreographer and Baltasar Kormákur Baltasarsson (better known as Baltasar Kormákur) in 1989. He graduated from Menntaskólinn í Reykjavík in 2008. During the first two years he was part of the school's drama department, but decided to quit in his third year to focus on other studies.

When Baltasar Breki was a boy he attended ballroom dancing classes. His mother recalls in a 2008 interview: "I think he only attended because he had a crush on the girl that he went with. He is a fine dancer and also very musical. He learned to play the guitar and has music in his entire body, not just in his fingers like some musicians do."

When Baltasar Breki was 18 years old, his father threw him out of the house. This is how he recalls that time in a 2015 interview:

"I was a troubled teen and not very interested in school. I was mainly there for the drama department. When you're 18 and thrown out there's not much else to do than find an apartment with the two Swedish girls you worked with at a bar. It all worked out in the end and I graduated, although my grades could have been better."

Filmography

Film

Television

Theatre credits

References

External links

Living people
1989 births
Baltasar Breki Samper
Baltasar Breki Samper
Baltasar Breki Samper
Baltasar Breki Samper
Baltasar Breki Samper